Start Again may refer to:

Music

Albums
Start Again (EP), 2018
Start Again EP, 2023
Start Again, a 2004 album by Alfie Zappacosta
Start Again, a 2013 album by Bill Deasy
Start Again, a 2005 album by Rhubarb
Start Again, an album by Ashley Robertson
Start Again, a 2021 album by Donny Osmond

Songs
“Start Again” (Ai song), 2022
"Start Again" (Conrad Sewell song), 2015
"Start Again" (OneRepublic song), 2018
"Start Again", a song by Vanessa Williams from Next
"Start Again", a song by Bret Michaels from Rock My World
"Start Again", a song by Red from Innocence & Instinct
"Start Again", a song by Ben Haenow from Ben Haenow
"Start Again", a 1994 song by Stevie Salas
"Start Again", a song by Lindisfarne from Sleepless Nights
"Start Again", a 1998 song by The Montrose Avenue
"Start Again", a 1997 song by Teenage Fanclub, covered by Counting Crows
"Start Again", a song by Fleetwood Mac, see Future Games
"Start Again", a song by Alive Like Me from Only Forever
"Start Again", a song by Professional Murder Music from Looking Through
"Start Again", a song by The Folk Implosion from Take a Look Inside
"Start Again", a song by Ayria from Debris
"Start Again", a song by Harvey "Tex" Thomas Young, see Live at Lincoln Hall
"Start Again", a song by The Electric Soft Parade from Holes in the Wall
"Start Again", a song by Stan Walker and Samantha Jade from the Born to Dance soundtrack
"Start Again", a song by War Tapes from The Continental Divide
"Start Again", a song by the John Butler Trio, see Grand National
"Start Again", a song by Ian McCulloch from Candleland
"Start Again", a song by Rico Blanco from Your Universe
"Start Again", a song by James Walsh from Lullaby
"Start Again", a song by Annette Ducharme, theme song of the CBC Television teen soap opera Edgemont
"Start Again", a song by Chris Lake
"Start Again", a 2011 song by Sam Tsui
"Start Again", a song by Nick Harper from Riven
"Start Again", a song by Look See Proof
"Start Again", a song by Bishop Allen
"Start Again", a song by The Rabble from The Battle's Almost Over
"Start Again", a song by Passion Killers from Bullshit Detector
"Start Again", a song by The Blue Nile
"Start Again", a song by Hardline from Leaving the End Open
"Start Again", a song by Starpool
"Start Again", a song by Bada
"Start Again", a song by Tokimonsta, featuring Shing02
"Start Again", a song by Eddie Bitar, featuring Christina Novelli
"Start Again", a song by Ty Tabor from Trip Magnet
"Start Again", a song by Driver Friendly from Unimagined Bridges
"Start Again", a song by The Aston Shuffle feat. Lovers Electric from Sessions Eight
"Start Again", a 2014 single by Hiroshi Kamiya